Richard McLaughlin may refer to:
Richard McLaughlin (lawyer) (born 1947), High Court judge in Northern Ireland
 Richard E. McLaughlin (1915-1993), Massachusetts government official